The Greek Orthodox Cathedral of St George is the Greek Orthodox church of Cape Town, South Africa, located in the district of Woodstock, and the seat of the Metropolitan of the Orthodox Archdiocese of Good Hope, under the Patriarchate of Alexandria and All Africa. 

The cathedral, believed to be the oldest Greek Orthodox church in Africa, is a Neoclassical church built as St George's Church in 1903–1904 by the Greek community. The interior is noted for its frescoes in the Byzantine style. In 1968 the church was elevated to the status of cathedral.

References

External links
University of South Africa: photo of St George's Cathedral, 1961

Cathedrals in South Africa
Churches in Cape Town
Greek Orthodox churches in South Africa
1904 establishments in South Africa
Neoclassical church buildings in South Africa